Guimini (Gǐwⁿrⁿì) is a village in the Cercle of Bandiagara in the Mopti Region of south-eastern Mali.

References

Communes of Mopti Region